Sainte-Marie–Saint-Jacques is a provincial electoral district in the Montreal region of Quebec, Canada that elects members to the National Assembly of Quebec. It comprises part of the borough of Ville-Marie and part of the borough of Le Plateau-Mont-Royal of the city of Montreal, including the eastern portion of Downtown Montreal as well as the Vieux-Montreal area.

It was created for the 1989 election from parts of Saint-Jacques and Sainte-Marie electoral districts.

In the change from the 2001 to the 2011 electoral map, its territory was unchanged.

Members of the National Assembly

Election results

|-
 
|Liberal
|Richard Brosseau
|align="right"|7,989
|align="right"|30.47
|align="right"|-0.67

|-

|-

|-

|-

|-

|}

|-
 
|Liberal
|Claude Longpré
|align="right"|9,722
|align="right"|31.14
|align="right"|-1.79

|-

|-

|Socialist Democracy
|Ginette Gauthier
|align="right"|629
|align="right"|2.01
|align="right"|-0.02
|-

|-

|-

|Natural Law
|Alain Lord
|align="right"|107
|align="right"|0.34
|align="right"|-0.47

|-

|No designation
|Michel Dugré
|align="right"|38
|align="right"|0.12
|align="right"|–
|-
|}

|-
 
|Liberal
|Martin Doré
|align="right"|10,061
|align="right"|32.93
|align="right"|-2.91

|-

|New Democratic
|Jocelyne Dupuis
|align="right"|621
|align="right"|2.03
|align="right"|+0.84
|-

|No designation
|Claude Leduc
|align="right"|479
|align="right"|1.57
|align="right"|–
|-

|Natural Law
|Christian Lord
|align="right"|246
|align="right"|0.81
|align="right"|–
|-

|Sovereignty
|Daniel Brunette
|align="right"|223
|align="right"|0.73
|align="right"|–
|-

|Independent
|Martram X.T. Marxram
|align="right"|109
|align="right"|0.36
|align="right"|–

|-

|-

|Development
|Charles Thibault
|align="right"|62
|align="right"|0.20
|align="right"|–
|-

|No designation
|Guy Tremblay
|align="right"|59
|align="right"|0.19
|align="right"|–
|-
|}

 
|Liberal
|Michel Laporte
|align="right"|10,039
|align="right"|35.84

|New Democratic
|Denis Plante
|align="right"|332
|align="right"|1.19

|Workers
|Gérard Lachance
|align="right"|189
|align="right"|0.67

|Parti indépendantiste
|Gilles Rhéaume
|align="right"|148
|align="right"|0.53

|Independent
|Michel Georges Abdelahad
|align="right"|109
|align="right"|0.39

|}

References

External links
Information
 Elections Quebec

Election results
 Election results (National Assembly)
 Election results (QuébecPolitique)

Maps
 2011 map (PDF)
 2001 map (Flash)
2001–2011 changes (Flash)
1992–2001 changes (Flash)
 Electoral map of Montreal region 
 Quebec electoral map, 2011 

Provincial electoral districts of Montreal
Quebec provincial electoral districts
Ville-Marie, Montreal
Centre-Sud
Quartier Latin, Montreal
Le Plateau-Mont-Royal